Davis Wolfgang Hawke (1978–2017) was a spammer who was sued by AOL in 2004 under the CAN-SPAM Act of 2003. Previously, in 1999 he started two neo-Nazi groups to make the "final solution a reality." He has been dubbed by the press as the "spam Nazi." Hawke was found shot to death as an unknown victim in Squamish in 2017 and identified in October 2020.

Biography
Hawke graduated from Westwood High School in 1996. Subsequently, he changed his name from Andrew Britt Greenbaum to Davis Wolfgang Hawke on 1997, after his 18th birthday. He went on to attend Wofford College in South Carolina, completing three years.

Despite Hawke's father being Jewish, while attending school he was a speaker and leader for two Neo-Nazi groups he started. His success was very limited. Under the pseudonym of "Bo Decker," he began selling Nazi merchandise and offering membership to his internet neo-Nazi group "Knights of Freedom" and later the American Nationalist Party. Hawke dropped out of college and turned his computer skills into spamming following embarrassingly low turnouts and support for his neo-Nazi groups. Hawke went on to earn thousands of dollars each week spamming email and cell phone numbers.

Hawke was known to be an aficionado of chess. In high school, he achieved a United States Chess Federation rating of nearly 2000.  In the late 1990s, Hawke played in South Carolina and Tennessee under the pseudonym Walter Smith. He played throughout Colorado as David A. Wallace on and off, before disappearing in approximately summer of 2006.

Over the years, Hawke used numerous aliases, even among his closest friends and business associates. During his time as a neo-Nazi, he referred to himself as Bo Decker. As a spammer, he typically went by aliases including Walter Cross, Johnny Durango, and Dave Bridger.

At a chess tournament in 2001, Hawke met Braden (Brad) Bournival, a New Hampshire high school student. Hawke tutored Bournival in the spam business, and, in 2003, they co-founded Amazing Internet Products. The company, which had offices in Manchester, New Hampshire, was responsible for millions of spams for an herbal (Yohimbe) "penis enhancement" product called Pinacle. By the summer of 2003, Amazing Internet Products was grossing around $500,000 per month.

One of Hawke's spam affiliates was Robby Todino, the so-called Time Travel Spammer.

In 2004 AOL won a $12.8-million judgment against Hawke in America Online, Inc. v. Davis Wolfgang Hawke, et al. AOL accused Hawke of violating anti-spam laws by sending unwanted emails to its subscribers and won its case in a default judgment against Hawke.

On August 15, 2006 AOL announced their intention to search for buried precious metals on the property of Hawke's parents in Medfield, Massachusetts. Hawke had previously claimed to have converted assets into precious metals and buried them. In 2007 AOL decided against the dig to search for the gold Hawke bragged about when he earned an estimated $600,000 for spamming ads for penis enlargement pills.

Hawke was found shot to death and burned in his vehicle in Squamish in 2017, where he had been living as a dirtbag climber under an assumed identity since 2006, but was not identified until October 2020.

Hawke's rise and fall as a spammer was chronicled in the 2004 book Spam Kings, in which he is the central case study.

See also
Dan Burros - a Jewish American Ku Klux Klan leader
Frank Collin - a Jewish American neo-Nazi
Weev - a Jewish neo-Nazi that writes for The Daily Stormer
List of spammers

References

External links
Knights of Freedom -Hawke's former website from Archive.org
America Online, Inc. v. Davis Wolfgang Hawke, et al from Eastern District of Virginia

Email spammers
1978 births
2017 deaths
American neo-Nazis
Neo-Nazis of Jewish descent
People from Medfield, Massachusetts
Wofford College alumni
American people of Jewish descent
People from Rhode Island